Tres caras de mujer is a Mexican telenovela produced by Ernesto Alonso for Telesistema Mexicano in 1963.

Cast 
 Ernesto Alonso as Claudio
 Amparo Rivelles as Laura
 Ramón Bugarini
  as Gustavo
 Prudencia Griffel
 Miguel Manzano
 Guillermo Murray
 Graciela Orozco
 Carmen Salas
 Fanny Schiller as Tia Epifania
 Mercedes Pascual
 Malú Galán
 E. Diaz Indiano
 Manuel García
 Mario Vega

References

External links 

Mexican telenovelas
1963 telenovelas
Televisa telenovelas
1963 Mexican television series debuts
1963 Mexican television series endings
Spanish-language telenovelas